The following radio stations broadcast on FM frequency 103.1 MHz:

Argentina
 Ambrosetti in Ambrosetti, Santa Fe
 Atlántica in Monte Hermoso, Buenos Aires
 Ciudad in Marcos Juárez, Córdoba
 Uno in Buenos Aires
 221 radio in La Plata, Buenos Aires
 Litoral in Paraná, Entre Ríos
 LRH354 Norte in Castelli, Chaco
 LRV384 Sol in Armstrong, Santa Fe
 Radiocanal in Córdoba
 Radio 2 in Mendoza 
 Radio María in General San Martín, Chaco
 Radio María in Serrezuela, Córdoba
 Vivencias in Sancti Spiritu, Santa Fe
 Radio Popular Che Guevara in Rosario, Santa Fe

Australia
 5EBI in Adelaide, South Australia
 ABC Classic in Tamworth, New South Wales
 4TSV in Townsville, Queensland
 Radio National in Rockhampton, Queensland
 Rhema FM in Grafton, New South Wales
3BBA in Ballarat, Victoria

Canada (Channel 276)
 CBEF-1-FM in Leamington, Ontario
 CBFZ-FM in Temiscaming, Quebec
 CBH-FM-2 in Mulgrave, Nova Scotia
 CBMH-FM in Schefferville, Quebec
 CBSI-FM-20 in Riviere-St-Paul, Quebec
 CBUF-FM-10 in Whistler, British Columbia
 CFHK-FM in St. Thomas, Ontario
 CFMF-FM in Fermont, Quebec
 CFMX-FM in Cobourg, Ontario
 CFSW-FM in Chaplin, Saskatchewan
 CFXL-FM in Calgary, Alberta
 CFYX-FM-3 in Riviere-du-Loup, Quebec
 CHAW-FM in Little Current, Ontario
 CHHO-FM in Louiseville, Quebec
 CHTT-FM in Victoria, British Columbia
 CIAU-FM in Radisson, Quebec
 CJBB-FM in Englehart, Ontario
 CJFW-FM in Terrace, British Columbia
 CJKC-FM in Kamloops, British Columbia
 CJMC-FM-3 in Les Mechins, Quebec
 CJMC-FM-6 in Cloridorme, Quebec
 CJMC-FM-8 in Murdochville, Quebec
 CJMO-FM in Moncton, New Brunswick
 CKBS-FM in Nakusp, British Columbia
 CKMM-FM in Winnipeg, Manitoba
 CKOD-FM in Valleyfield, Quebec
 CKQQ-FM in Kelowna, British Columbia
 VF2152 in McBride, British Columbia
 VF2240 in Uranium City, Saskatchewan
 VF2426 in Wynyard, Saskatchewan

China 
 CNR The Voice of China in Wenzhou

Indonesia
 PM2FGU in Surabaya, East Java

Mexico
 XHACS-FM in Playa del Carmen, Quintana Roo
 XHAGS-FM in Acapulco, Guerrero
 XHEPO-FM in San Luis Potosí, San Luis Potosí
 XHFQ-FM in Cananea, Sonora
 XHJTF-FM in La Cruz, Jalisco
 XHKD-FM in Ciudad Acuña, Coahuila
 XHMDR-FM in Ciudad Madero, Tamaulipas
 XHPBPE-FM in Pedro Escobedo, Querétaro
 XHPYM-FM in Mérida, Yucatán
 XHSIBT-FM in San Andrés Tziróndaro, Quiroga Municipality, Michoacán
 XHUAT-FM in Santa María Huatulco, Oaxaca
 XHWQ-FM in Monclova, Coahuila
 XHXF-FM in León, Guanajuato
 XHZMA-FM in Zamora, Michoacán

Magyarország
 Rádió 1 Győr

Philippines
DZRR in Baguio City
DWYO in Puerto Princesa City
DWSV in Naga City
DYMG in Bacolod City
DYTG in Tacloban City
DXIL in Iligan City
DXFQ in General Santos City
DXAM-FM in Butuan City

United Kingdom
 Free Radio in Shropshire
 Heart FM West Kent
 3TFM in Saltcoats, Scotland

United States (Channel 276)
  in Oakhurst, California
 KACP in Pahrump, Nevada
 KBIE in Auburn, Nebraska
  in Post Falls, Idaho
 KCDX in Florence, Arizona
 KDAA in Rolla, Missouri
 KDLD in Santa Monica, California
 KDLE in Newport Beach, California
  in Burlington, Iowa
 KDMM in Parker Strip, Arizona
 KDRP-LP in Dripping Springs, Texas
 KEDJ in Jerome, Idaho
 KEEP in Bandera, Texas
  in Olpe, Kansas
 KFFA-FM in Helena, Arkansas
 KFIL-FM in Chatfield, Minnesota
 KFWA in Weldona, Colorado
 KHAM in Britt, Iowa
 KHFZ in Pittsburg, Texas
 KHQT in Las Cruces, New Mexico
  in Weaverville, California
 KIPW-LP in Salinas, California
  in Madison, South Dakota
 KJHF in Kualapuu, Hawaii
 KKCN in Ballinger, Texas
  in Colusa, California
  in Ravenna, Nebraska
 KLO-FM in Coalville, Utah
  in Paso Robles, California
  in Muleshoe, Texas
  in Anchorage, Alaska
 KNNW in Columbia, Louisiana
  in Enid, Oklahoma
 KPAI-LP in Paisley, Oregon
  in Fabens, Texas
 KQPS in Palm Desert, California
 KRSB-FM in Roseburg, Oregon
  in Columbia Falls, Montana
  in Wimbledon, North Dakota
  in Sitka, Alaska
 KSCW-LP in Sun City West, Arizona
 KSHK in Hanamaulu, Hawaii
  in Aspen, Colorado
 KSRY in Tehachapi, California
 KSSM in Copperas Cove, Texas
 KTJT-LP in Davenport, Iowa
 KURR in Hildale, Utah
 KUTZ-LP in Sacramento, California
 KVBL in Union, Oregon
  in Helena, Montana
 KVJM in Hearne, Texas
 KVWC-FM in Vernon, Texas
 KWLA in Anacoco, Louisiana
 KXSA-FM in Dermott, Arkansas
 KXVV in Victorville, California
 KXWY in Hudson, Wyoming
  in Sundance, Wyoming
  in Ellensburg, Washington
 KYMJ-LP in Carroll, Iowa
 KZKV in Karnes City, Texas
 KZOS-LP in San Marcos, Texas
 WAFY in Middletown, Maryland
  in Lawrenceville, Illinois
 WAUJ-LP in Laurel, Mississippi
  in Bay Shore, New York
 WCIK in Avoca, New York
  in Morris, Illinois
 WDBG in Dexter, Georgia
 WEMV-LP in Vandalia, Illinois
 WEOM-LP in Thomasville, North Carolina
  in Moulton, Alabama
 WFEC-LP in Winston-Salem, North Carolina
  in Plantation Key, Florida
  in Augusta, Georgia
 WFYY in Windermere, Florida
  in Henderson, Kentucky
  in Gladwin, Michigan
  in Rockton, Illinois
  in Albany, New York
  in Parkersburg, West Virginia
 WHME (FM) in South Bend, Indiana
 WHQA in Honea Path, South Carolina
 WIKQ in Tusculum, Tennessee
  in Avoca, Pennsylvania
 WIRK in Indiantown, Florida
  in Newburgh, New York
 WJLJ in Etowah, Tennessee
 WJMA in Culpeper, Virginia
 WJSS-LP in Wilmington, North Carolina
 WJYI in Tifton, Georgia
 WKVE in Waynesburg, Pennsylvania
 WKZS in Covington, Indiana
 WLHC in Robbins, North Carolina
 WLQC in Sharpsburg, North Carolina
  in Columbia, South Carolina
 WMXX-FM in Jackson, Tennessee
  in Napoleon, Ohio
 WNHZ-LP in Littleton, New Hampshire
 WNMQ in Columbus, Mississippi
 WOGB in Reedsville, Wisconsin
 WOSM (FM) in Ocean Springs, Mississippi
 WOWY in State College, Pennsylvania
  in Coal Run, Kentucky
 WPNA-FM in Highland Park, Illinois
  in Russell, Pennsylvania
  in Lyndon, Kentucky
  in Lapeer, Michigan
  in State College, Pennsylvania
 WRAC (FM) in West Union, Ohio
 WRHS in Grasonville, Maryland
  in Lewisburg, West Virginia
  in Surfside Beach, South Carolina
  in Carthage, New York
  in Greensboro, North Carolina
 WUGR-LP in Miaramar, Florida
  in Johnstown, Ohio
 WVLP-LP in Valparaiso, Indiana
 WVSC in Port Royal, South Carolina
 WVUV-FM in Fagaitua, American Samoa
  in Manchester, Kentucky
  in Tallahassee, Florida
 WZLB in Valparaiso, Florida
 WZKC in Royalton, Vermont
  in Dover-Foxcroft, Maine
  in Oneonta, New York

Reference 

Lists of radio stations by frequency